Lactarius pallescens  is a Western North American "milk-cap" mushroom, of which the milk turns violet when the flesh is damaged.  The fungi generally identified as L. pallescens are part of a complex of closely related species and varieties which have a peppery taste and are difficult to delimit definitively.

The gray-brown cap ranges from 3 to 10 cm in width, with a mucilaginous surface, whitish flesh and white latex. The gills are whitish and sometimes slightly decurrent. The viscid stalk ranges from 3 to 8 cm long and 1 to 2 cm wide. The spores are pale yellow to orange, elliptical, and bumpy. The flesh of the mushroom stains lilac. In age, reddish stains develop.

Distribution
Lactarius pallescens is found on the West Coast of the United States. In the Pacific Northwest, it can be found in conifer forests.

Related species
Lactarius uvidus (a close relative) and Lactarius californiensis are similar.

See also
List of Lactarius species

References

External links 

Lactarius pallescens at Mykoweb
Distribution Map

pallescens
Fungi described in 1979
Fungi of North America
Taxa named by Alexander H. Smith